Salempur is a constituency of the Uttar Pradesh Legislative Assembly covering the city of Salempur in the Deoria district of Uttar Pradesh, India.

Salempur is one of five assembly constituencies in the Salempur Lok Sabha constituency. Since 2008, this assembly constituency is numbered 341 amongst 403 constituencies.

This seat belonged to Bharatiya Janta Party candidate Kali Prasad who won in last Assembly election of 2017 Uttar Pradesh Legislative Elections defeating Samajwadi Party candidate Vijay Laxmi Gautam by a margin of 25,654 votes.

Members of Legislative Assembly

References

External links
 

Assembly constituencies of Uttar Pradesh